The 1932 World Table Tennis Championships men's singles was the sixth edition of the men's singles championship.

Viktor Barna defeated Miklós Szabados in the final of this event. Barna won the final three sets to two.

Draw

Finals

References

-